John Joseph McCarthy (April 25, 1934 – May 9, 2020) was an American basketball player and coach.  A  point guard, he played college basketball and was an All-American at Canisius College. He was selected by the Rochester Royals in the 1956 NBA draft.  He played a total of six seasons in the National Basketball Association (NBA)—two for the Royals, three for the St. Louis Hawks, and one for the Boston Celtics.

McCarthy is the first of only four players in NBA history to record a triple-double in his playoff debut, with 13 points, 11 rebounds and 11 assists against the Minneapolis Lakers on March 16, 1960; he was later joined by Magic Johnson in 1980, LeBron James in 2006 and Nikola Jokic in 2019.

McCarthy later coached the Buffalo Braves, his hometown team, for part of a season. McCarthy died on May 9, 2020.

References

External links
 BasketballReference.com: Johnny McCarthy (as player)
 BasketballReference.com: Johnny McCarthy (as coach)

1934 births
2020 deaths
American men's basketball coaches
American men's basketball players
Basketball coaches from New York (state)
Basketball players from Buffalo, New York
Boston Celtics players
Buffalo Braves head coaches
Canisius Golden Griffins men's basketball coaches
Canisius Golden Griffins men's basketball players
Pittsburgh Rens players
Point guards
Rochester Royals draft picks
Rochester Royals players
Sportspeople from Buffalo, New York
St. Louis Hawks players